Now I'll Tell One is a 1927 silent film starring Charley Chase. The film features Stan Laurel and Oliver Hardy. However, while both comedians had bit parts, they were still not officially a team, and share no scenes together.

The first half of the film is considered lost; only the latter half survives.

Plot 
A husband (Chase) is being divorced by his wife (Edna Marion). She recounts his cruelty, abuse, and drunkenness before a judge (Will Walling) at court. His lawyer (Laurel) attempts to defend him but only succeeds in making his client look worse. Oliver Hardy has a small part as a police officer.

Cast 
Charley Chase - Charley
Edna Marion - Wife
Stan Laurel - Lawyer
Will Walling - Judge
Oliver Hardy - Policeman
Wilson Benge
Lincoln Plummer
May Wallace

See also 
List of incomplete or partially lost films

References

External links 
 

1927 films
1927 comedy films
Silent American comedy films
American silent short films
American black-and-white films
Films directed by James Parrott
1927 short films
American comedy short films
Lost American films
Lost comedy films
1927 lost films
1920s American films